Ángel Segura (born 4 August 1982) is a Uruguayan windsurfer. He competed in the men's Mistral One Design event at the 2004 Summer Olympics.

References

1982 births
Living people
Uruguayan male sailors (sport)
Uruguayan windsurfers
Olympic sailors of Uruguay
Sailors at the 2004 Summer Olympics – Mistral One Design
Sportspeople from Montevideo